Los Angeles Pop Art (also known as LA Pop Art) is an American company, founded by Joseph Leibovic, headquartered in Las Vegas, Nevada. The company creates text based artwork, entirely drawn by hand, also known as Micrography.
By using entire movie scripts, complete song lyrics and manuscripts, Los Angeles Pop Art creates images out of the text that tell the story of that specific image.

The portfolio of designs are used for the manufacture of a number of products, which include Apparel, Wall Art and more. These products are sold online in numerous stores as well as in traditional brick and mortar retailers. The portfolio is also licensed out to partner companies for the manufacture of a wide range of products that include everything from stickers to beach towels.

In 1994 founder Joseph Leibovic was living in Israel when he stumbled upon the Micrography style of art while watching street artists, in the mystical town of Tzvat. The idea of Americanizing this style of art, by creating posters of classic films out of entire scripts, and music icons out of their legendary lyrics, was matured over the following 9 years. It wasn’t until Joseph moved back to Los Angeles, in 2004, that the idea was finally brought to life and Los Angeles Pop Art was founded.

Los Angeles Pop Art has worked with some of the biggest names in music and film creating pieces for ACDC, KISS, David Bowie, The Bob Marley Estate, Godfather, Scarface, Rocky, Nirvana, and many more A+ properties.

The work developed at Los Angeles Pop Art has been featured in top magazines such as Playboy, Rolling Stone, Maxim and Stuff, as well as in top rated TV and films like Breaking Bad, Weeds, The Sopranos, Jersey Shore, The Girls Next Door, Workaholics and Battle: Los Angeles.

Some of Los Angeles Pop Art’s original art is also included in major art collections and exhibits, such as The Ronald Reagan Presidential Art Collection and being included in The Amazing Collection at Ripley’s Believe it Or Not museums around the world.

Notable accomplishments

A Ronald Reagan design, recreating President Ronald Reagan’s face out of his famous "Tear down this wall!" speech, given at the Brandenburg Gate in Germany, was created by Los Angeles Pop Art in 2005. This piece of art was accepted by the Ronald Reagan Presidential Library into the Official Presidential Art Collection. The artwork is currently on display in the Lobby of the Ronald Reagan Presidential Library in Simi Valley, California.

A partnership with Vivendi Games, in 2006, regarding the release of Scarface: The World Is Yours video game, led Los Angeles Pop Art to create an exclusive poster to be used as a pre-order gift by Vivendi Games, in order to assist in the pre-ordering of the game. The poster consisted in depicting an iconic film scene, using micrography, with the original film script.

Joseph Leibovic was interviewed live on the nationwide Top Rated Mancow Radio show after host Mancow Muller discovered LA Pop Art and wanted to share the art with his listeners.

Los Angeles Pop Art was approached in 2010 by Ripley's Believe It or Not! Museums. Ripley’s now shows several Los Angeles Pop Art originals in different locations all over the world, spanning from Tokyo to Hollywood, as part of their permanent collection of amazing things.

Also in 2010, Los Angeles Pop Art received 2 awards for vendor excellence from Overstock.com. The first was for Highest Average Partner Scorecard and the other was for Best in Stock % Score in the Clothing and Shoes category.

Los Angeles Pop Art work is published in the Ripley's Believe It or Not Annual 2012 book featuring an illustration based on the Lewis Carroll's novel, Alice's Adventures in Wonderland.

High-profile tourist gift shops, as of 2012, will be supplied by Los Angeles Pop Art with its unique products. Some of the locations include Times Square, Chicago Skydeck, Washington National Cathedral, Abraham Lincoln Presidential Library, The Mob Museum in Las Vegas, Ford’s Theatre, Gettysburg Battlefield Museum, Independence Visitors Center, U.S.S. Midway Museum The American Museum of Natural History in NYC, Museum of Science Boston and countless others.

Licensing

Acting as a licensee 
Since its inception, Los Angeles Pop Art has had a strong licensing program, acting as a licensee for some of the world’s largest Music and Film Properties.

Properties in which Los Angeles Pop Art has acted as a licensee for include:

 ACDC
 David Bowie
 KISS
 Def Leppard
 ZZ Top
 Nirvana
 Star Trek
 Lyrics to Freebird by Lynyrd Skynyrd
 Scarface
 Bob Marley
 Rocky
 Reservoir Dogs
 The Godfather
 University of Alabama
 Auburn University
 Florida State University
 University of Georgia
 University of Texas at Austin
 Louisiana State University
 University of Miami
 University of Michigan
 University of Tennessee
 University of Wisconsin
 Lyrics to California Dreamin' by The Mamas and Papas
 Lyrics to Dust in The Wind by Kansas
 Lyrics to Born To Be Wild by Steppenwolf
 Lyrics to Viva Las Vegas by Elvis Presley
 Lyrics to Evil Ways by Santana
 Lyrics to Sweet Home Alabama by Lynyrd Skynyrd
 Lyrics to Rock and Roll All Nite by KISS
 Lyrics to Renegades of Funk by Afrika Bambaataa
 Lyrics to Mr. Brightside by The Killers

Studios/Companies in which Los Angeles Pop Art have had licensing partnerships with include:

 Universal Studios
 Paramount Pictures
 The Bob Marley Estate / Fifty Six Hope Street
 Universal Music Group
 EMI
 Warner/Chappell Music
 Pomus Songs
 Collegiate Licensing Company
 CBS Consumer Products
 Lionsgate
 MGM Studios

Acting as a licensor 
With its growing portfolio of original artwork, Los Angeles Pop Art has been building its own licensing program licensing out its original designs to be used on wide variety of products.

Studios/Companies in which Los Angeles Pop Art have licensing original artwork to include:

 Pyramid International
 Bed Bath & Beyond
 Mcgaw Graphics
 Ripple junction
 ZingRevolution.com
 Live Nation / Trunk
 Trends international
 Scorpio posters
 Dragonfly

References

Visual arts genres
Companies based in Los Angeles